Girl Picture is a 2022 Finnish coming-of-age film directed by Alli Haapasalo from a screenplay by Ilona Ahti and Daniela Hakulinen. It premiered at the 2022 Sundance Film Festival where it won the Audience Award in the World Dramatic Competition. It was released in Finland on 14 April 2022.

Plot
Three young girls at the cusp of womanhood, Mimmi, Rönkkö and Emma, try to defy the persistent winter darkness in Finland by trying to draw their own contours. In the process, they move between dreams, reality, friendship and relationships, and try to make sense of the whole mess. In three consecutive Fridays, two of them experience the earth moving effects of falling in love, while the third goes on a quest to find something she's never experienced before: pleasure.

Cast

Production
Principal photography took place in 2021. The film was shot in Academy ratio.

See also
 List of submissions to the 95th Academy Awards for Best International Feature Film
 List of Finnish submissions for the Academy Award for Best International Feature Film

References

External links
 
  Girl Picture at Citizen Jane Productions
  Girl Picture at Cineuropa
2022 films
2022 LGBT-related films
Coming-of-age romance films
Figure skating films
Finnish LGBT-related films
Finnish romantic drama films
Finnish teen films
Lesbian-related films
LGBT-related coming-of-age films
Sundance Film Festival award winners
2020s Finnish-language films